Ocean City Nor'easters is an American soccer team based in Ocean City, New Jersey. Founded in 1996, the team currently plays in USL League Two, the fourth tier of the American Soccer Pyramid.

The team plays their home games at Carey Stadium which is located right next to the boardwalk in Ocean City, New Jersey. The stadium's nickname "The Beach House" was coined during the 2005 season by the team's play-by-play announcer Josh Hakala. The team's colors are royal blue and orange.

They are among the most successful USL League Two teams since joining the league in 2003 after six seasons in the USISL D-3 Pro League. Since 2003, they have the fifth-best regular season record and the fourth-best home record in the league. They are also one of the best amateur clubs in the country when it comes to the U.S. Open Cup. As a USL League Two team, they have won 11 games (12 of them as a franchise) with six of them coming against professional opponents. Only two Open Division amateur teams Flint City Bucks with 10 and Des Moines Menace with 7) have more pro team upsets in the tournament's Modern Era (1995–present).

In 2008, the Barons formed a partnership with Reading of the English Football League Championship that has since ended. In 2010, following a split between the PDL team and their youth soccer affiliate, the team re-branded to Ocean City FC, adopted Reading's colors, and a similar badge. The team also adopted a new nickname: the Nor'easters. Since the re-brand the team has won two Eastern Conference championships (2013, 2016)

History

South Jersey Barons, D-3 Pro League (1996–2002)

The club was founded in 1996 as the South Jersey Barons and joined the United Systems of Independent Soccer Leagues (USISL) as a professional franchise, competing in the USISL D-3 Pro League (now the United Soccer League). In 1998, in only their second year in existence, the Barons won the Mid-Atlantic Division title. The next year, they followed that up with a second straight playoff appearance and a run to the USISL D-3 national championship game. On September 11, 1999, the Barons, playing the title game on the road, lost 2–1 to the Western Mass Pioneers. The Barons made a third straight playoff appearance in 2000, but would struggle for the next three years, never finishing above fourth place in the division.

USL League Two (2003 – Present)
In 2003, the Barons moved to the USL Premier Development League, and after finishing in fourth place in their inaugural season, they made history in their second season in the PDL. In 2004, they became the fifth team in league history to go through the regular season with an unbeaten record (14–0–4). They won the Northeast Division title that year, but their season came to the end in the playoffs. In the conference championship game at McPherson Stadium in Greensboro, North Carolina, they lost to the Carolina Dynamo 3–2 on a goal in the 90th minute.

In 2005, the South Jersey Barons were taken over by local businessmen Russ McPaul and Giancarlo Granese. Their first act as new owners was to move the Barons to Ocean City, New Jersey, and rename the team the Ocean City Barons. The club moved into its new home at Carey Stadium on 6th street and the Boardwalk.

In their first full season at Carey Stadium in the USL League Two, the club won every game in the regular season at home (8–0–0), and finished with a 12–3–1 overall record under the direction of player-coach-general manager Neil Holloway. By the end of the regular season, their home unbeaten streak had reached 22 games, with their last home loss coming back on June 7, 2003, against the Vermont Voltage. The fans came out to see the Barons win that year, as the club finished with the sixth-best home attendance in the USL League Two. They hosted the Eastern Conference playoffs, but were upset in the conference semifinals by the Richmond Kickers Future 4–3 on a goal in the final seconds of regulation by Richmond's Dominic Oduro.

2006 marked the 10th season for the Barons organization, but on the field, despite finishing with a winning record, it was considered a down year by club standards. The Barons finished with a 6–4–6 record, which was good enough for second place in the Northeast Division, and they missed the playoffs for the first time since moving to the PDL. The Barons’ home unbeaten streak came to an end on July 16 when they lost 2–1 to the Ottawa Fury. The streak, which still stands as a club record, ended at 28 games. Since 2003, no USL League Two team has achieved a longer home unbeaten streak.

In 2007, long-time Ocean City High School head coach Mike Pellegrino took over the coaching duties and returned the Barons to the playoffs. Their 9–3–4 record earned them a second-place finish in the Mid-Atlantic Division. Their home record continued with a 6–1–1 mark and the Barons were selected by the league to host the Eastern Conference playoffs for the second time in three years. The club lost in the conference semifinals to the Cape Cod Crusaders 5–0 after they had two players sent off in the opening 24 minutes of the match.

The 2008 campaign was a tale of two halves as the club suffered its worst season since joining the USL League Two. Despite this, they still had a winning record with 6 wins, 5 losses and 5 draws. In the first half of the season, the Barons were unbeaten, with a record of 4–0–4, but the second half of the season was a different story, finishing with a 2–5–1 record. Some of the highlights included Byron Carmichael becoming the club's all-time leader in goals and points, while finishing the season with an even 100 career points. Ocean City's 8–1 win over the expansion New Jersey Rangers was a historic one as Steve Miller scored the club's third hat trick in franchise history and it was the most goals scored in a game and the largest margin of victory that the club has ever enjoyed as a member of the USL League Two.

The Barons bounced back from a disappointing 2008 season with one of the club's greatest campaigns in 2009. In addition to a pair of professional team upsets in the U.S. Open Cup and a date with D.C. United of Major League Soccer, Ocean City had a great regular season and a historic postseason run. After a 9–4–3 record earned them a third-place finish in the competitive Northeast Division and a spot in the postseason, they made history with two playoff wins before advancing to the PDL quarterfinals. The Barons eliminated the Long Island Rough Riders, the second best defensive team in the PDL, 2–0 in the opening round, giving OC their first playoff win since 2004. In the next round, the Men In Red handed the undefeated Ottawa Fury their first loss of the season with a 2–1 overtime win on a 98th-minute goal by Tyler Bellamy. The playoff run came to an end in Des Moines, Iowa, where they lost to the Chicago Fire Premier 3–0.

Rebrand as the Nor'easters

The club rebranded itself after the 2009 season, becoming the Ocean City Nor’easters and adopting the color scheme (royal blue & white) of English club Reading. However, in their first season with their new identity in 2010, the team struggled, finishing with a 5–6–5 record, their first losing season since they joined the PDL in 2003. By and large, the team featured a very young, inexperienced roster and failed to qualify for the post-season and the Lamar Hunt U.S. Open Cup. The season could have been different with a few different bounces of the ball, as four of the six losses suffered were by one goal.

The 2011 season was one of high promise that teetered on the edge of success. The Nor’easters finished with a 2–6–8 record knowing that if they had turned the ties into victories then the season would have had a completely different look to it. The young players from the Under-20 Men continue to push into the first team and the Nor’easters Academy is already proving successful with the likes of Mitch Grotti, Jerry Guzzo and Gio Tacconelli all graduating to the PDL first team in 2011.

The Ocean City Nor’easters began the 2012 season with a change of Head Coach with Neil Holloway concentrating on his general manager duties and Rutgers-Camden coach Tim Oswald joining the team. The Nor’easters put together a strong, deep roster that saw them go on a 13–3–0 regular season record which resulted in them winning the Mid-Atlantic Division and qualifying for the 2013 U.S. Open Cup. The Nor’easters recorded one of their biggest attendances of 1,175 for their final home game as the supporters gave their appreciation for the exciting and successful season.

The Nor’easters' 2013 season was arguably their greatest to date. Ocean City finished with an 11-2-1 record (2nd best record in Eastern Conference) and qualified for the playoffs. In the postseason, they won the Eastern Conference championship and advanced to the PDL Semifinals. Earlier in the season, they added to their U.S. Open Cup resume by upsetting the Pittsburgh Riverhounds of the United Soccer League to earn their fifth win over a pro team. In the following round, they nearly knocked off the Philadelphia Union but the Major League Soccer side scored a game-winning goal in second half stoppage time.

After another winning season in 2014 (7-5-2), the Nor'easters lost out on a playoff berth in 2015 on the final day of the campaign. The 2016 season, the club got back to their winning ways with a roster that was almost unrecognizable from the previous year. A 9-5-0 record was good enough for second place in the Mid-Atlantic Division and a spot in the PDL playoffs. When they got into the postseason, they made the most of it. They defeated three division champions en route to the PDL Semifinals with wins over the GPS Portland Phoenix, Charlotte Eagles, and their long-time rival Reading United AC in the conference final. They would fall to the Calgary Foothills FC in the Semifinals hosted at Carey Stadium.

In 2017, former Ocean City defender John Thompson took over as head coach as Tim Oswald shifted to a front office role as Sporting Director. Despite finishing with a better regular season record (9-4-1) than the previous year's Eastern Conference championship team, the Nor'easters missed out on the PDL playoffs due to a change in the playoff format. In 2018, the division was even more competitive after adding the Long Island Rough Riders and a second straight nine-win season (9-5-0) wasn't enough to qualify for the postseason, and because the US Soccer Federation reduced the number of Open Division teams that were included in the 2019 tournament, they did not qualify for the U.S. Open Cup.

Prior to the 2019 season, John Thompson announced he was stepping down from the role as head coach. Later that offseason, the club announced that Tim Oswald would return to the sidelines as head coach with Kevin Nuss returning to the club to replace Oswald as Sporting Director. However, a week before the season, Oswald announced that he would be stepping down as head coach due to a medical concern and Kevin Nuss would take over as head coach. The team finished second in the Mid-Atlantic Division.

After the 2020 season was canceled due to the COVID-19 pandemic, play resumed in 2021 under new leadership. Alan McCann, who had won the last two USL2 Coach of the Year awards while in charge of rival Reading United AC, was hired to lead the Nor'easters in the club's 24th season . McCann led the Nor'easters back to the playoffs but the Storm ultimately fell short, dropping a narrow 1-0 decision to West Chester United in the Eastern Conference Semifinals . The Nor'easters finished with a 9-2-3 record, the club's best regular season record since 2013. Ocean City finished in second place in the Mid-Atlantic Division for the second year in a row.

The Nor'easters did it by making some history along the way on both sides of the ball. Offensively, the 2021 team scored 40 goals, the second most in the league, and the most by an Ocean City team since 2005. The club was led by Simon Becher with 11 goals. Becher, who was named to the All-Conference team , led the league in game-winning goals and finished tied for third in goals. On the defensive side, it was one of the best back lines in club history, allowing just 12 goals in 14 regular season games with a 0.86 team goals against average. Both were records for a 14-game season. Another defensive accomplishment was eight clean sheets across all competitions, the second-most in club history.

U.S. Open Cup
Adding to their success in the league, the Barons have also qualified for the U.S. Open Cup on five occasions. They made their first appearance in 2002, their final year as a professional franchise. That year, they defeated Vereinigung Erzgebirge of the USASA 4–0 in the first round, but were eliminated in the next round 1–0 by the Hampton Roads Mariners, who played in the level above the Barons, in the A-League (now called the USL First Division).

In 2004, the year of their undefeated league season in the PDL, they began the tournament with a 5–0 thrashing of the USASA's Allied SC, and once again met an A-League team in the second round. The Syracuse Salty Dogs were the club, which featured Anthony Maher, the older brother of the Barons’ Matthew Maher. It was only the second time in the Professional Era (1995–present) of the Open Cup that two brothers played against each other in a Cup game. The original match seemed to be heading in the Barons’ direction in the 75th minute with the score tied at 1–1, and the Salty Dogs playing with nine men. Unfortunately for the underdogs, the referee abandoned the match at that point due to lightning and darkness. Six days later, the match was replayed, and despite Neil Holloway giving the Barons a 1–0 lead in the 22nd minute, Syracuse was too strong, knocking the Barons out of the tournament by the score of 4–2.

The following year, the Barons made a return to the Cup and made their biggest impression in club history. They began as they had the previous two tournament appearances with a 3–0 shutout win over historic USASA club, New York Greek-American Atlas. The Barons would host their second round match against the Long Island Rough Riders of the USL Second Division, and they used their home field advantage at Carey Stadium to thrash the Rough Riders 4–0. Ruben Mingo, Tony Donatelli, Chris Williams and Steven Wacker all scored in one of the second round's biggest upsets.

In the third round, the Barons were on the short end of a historical Open Cup match in Richmond, Virginia. Again, weather played a role, postponing the original game date, and a week later, the match was delayed by two hours. When the match was finally completed, the Barons had lost to the Richmond Kickers of the USL First Division, 8–4. The Kickers answered Byron Carmichael’s opening goal, with four straight tallies in the first half. Just before halftime, Carmichael cut the lead to two, and just after the break Tony Donatelli’s goal made it 4–3 in the 54th minute. However, the home side was too strong, and with the Barons pushing for an equalizer, the Kickers opened the floodgates. 12 goals was the most total goals scored in an Open Cup match since professional teams began entering the tournament in 1995. The four goals conceded by the Richmond Kickers was the most they had allowed in their Open Cup history.

After missing out on the tournament in 2006, the Barons returned to the Cup in 2007 and began at home with a 1–0 upset over Crystal Palace Baltimore of the USL Second Division. They hosted the second round as well and lost 2–1 to the Harrisburg City Islanders in one of the more exciting matches of the 2007 Open Cup. The Barons had three balls cleared off the line in the second half, but they weren't able to equalize.

2009 was a landmark season for the Barons in the Open Cup as they qualified for the Open Cup for the fourth time in the last six years. But the biggest highlight was the fact that Ocean City faced off with a club from Major League Soccer for the first time in franchise history. The Barons’ run in the tournament began with a shocking 3–0 home upset of Crystal Palace Baltimore of the USL Second Division. Byron Carmichael was named TheCup.us Player of the Round after scoring a pair of first half goals and J. T. Noone would put the nail in the coffin with a second half goal. The upsets at The Beach House continued in Round 2 when the Barons’ Tunde Ogunbiyi shutout the Real Maryland Monarchs of the Second Division and Noone converted a penalty kick in the second period of overtime to put the Barons into the third round by a score of 1–0. With the win, Ocean City became only the sixth amateur team in Open Cup history to register back-to-back wins over professional teams. In Round 3, the Barons would put a scare into D.C. United but would fall 2–0 to the defending Open Cup champs on a wet night at the Maryland SoccerPlex in Germantown, Maryland.

As a PDL team in the Lamar Hunt U.S. Open Cup, Ocean City have six wins with five of them being upsets of professional clubs. Only one other PDL team has more wins and upsets in the tournament (Michigan Bucks with 9.) After not qualifying for the U.S. Open Cup tournament from 2010 to 2012, the Ocean City returned to Cup action in 2013 defeating the New York Red Bull U-23's in the First Round at Carey Stadium 2–0. In the 2013 2nd Round they defeated USL Pro side the Pittsburgh Riverhounds 1–0 at Carey Stadium marking the team's fifth win over a professional team. However, they were beaten by the Philadelphia Union of MLS in the next round by the score of 2–1, after the Union scored a goal in second half stoppage time.

Ocean City goalkeeper Tunde Ogunbiyi remains the only PDL goalkeeper as well just the third amateur GK to earn a clean sheet against consecutive professional teams in the U.S. Open Cup during the Modern Era. (1995–present)

In 2017, the Nor'easters hosted Junior Lone Star FC of the Philadelphia Premier Soccer League in the opening round. After a 3-1 win, they advance to Round 2 where they hosted the Harrisburg City Islanders in a rematch of the 2007 Lamar Hunt U.S. Open Cup. After 120 minutes of scoreless soccer, Harrisburg won the penalty kick shootout 6-5. For Ocean City, it was the sixth shutout of a professional team, more than any amateur team in the Modern Era.

In 2018, the Nor'easters had to play all of their games on the road, starting with a 3-0 win in Ypsilanti, Michigan over NPSL power AFC Ann Arbor. Next, they traveled to North Carolina to take on the Charlotte Independence of the USL and they won the game 3-1 to earn their sixth win over a professional team in the competition. It was the first time they had upset a professional team away from home and it was the first time they did so while allowing a goal (the previous five were all shutouts). They would return to North Carolina where their US Open Cup run would come to an end with a 4-1 loss to North Carolina FC of the USL.

U.S. Open Cup Results

Players

Current roster
As of June 12, 2022.

Notable former players
This list of notable former players comprises players who went on to play professional soccer after playing for the team in the Premier Development League, or those who previously played professionally before joining the team.

Year-by-year

Honors
 2022 USL League Two Mid-Atlantic Division Champions
 2016 USL PDL Eastern Conference Champions
 2013 USL PDL Eastern Conference Champions
 2013 USL PDL Mid-Atlantic Division Champions
 2012 USL PDL Mid-Atlantic Division Champions
 2004 USL PDL Northeast Division Champions
 1999 USISL D-3 Pro League Regular Season Champions
 1999 USISL D-3 Pro League Northern Division Champions
 1998 USISL D-3 Pro League Mid Atlantic Division Champions

Organizational Awards
 2008 USL PDL Organization of the Year
 2007 USL PDL Communications Award
 2007 USL PDL Executive of the Year (Neil Holloway)
 2006 USL Hall of Fame Inductee ("10+ club")
 2005 USL Progress Award

Head coaches
  Matt Driver (1997–5/3/2002) Record: 53–38–2
  Sam Maira (5/11/2002–2003) Record: 16–16–3
  Dan Christian (2004) Record: 14–0–4
  Mike Pellegrino (2007–2008) Record: 15–8–9
  Neil Holloway (2005–2006, 2009–2011) Record: 32–17–15
  Tim Oswald (2012–2016) Record: 47-19-6
  John Thompson (2017–2018) Record: 18-9-1
  Kevin Nuss (2019) Record: 6-3-5
  Alan McCann (2021) Record: 9-2-3
  Kevin Nuss (2022) Record: TBD

Stadium

Carey Stadium ("The Beach House") in Ocean City, New Jersey has been the primary home for the Ocean City Nor'easters for the majority of the club's history with the exception of the 2001, 2003 and 2004 seasons. In 2002, the season was split between Carey Stadium and Community Park at Rutgers-Camden University in Newark, NJ. Since 2005, when the club made its permanent home at Carey Stadium, the Nor'easters have had to play eight games at the nearby Tennessee Avenue Soccer Complex in Ocean City, New Jersey due to scheduling conflicts and when the turf at Carey Stadium was being replaced.

1997
Carey Stadium; Ocean City, New Jersey
Eastern Regional High School ; Voorhees, NJ (1 game)

1998
Carey Stadium; Ocean City, New Jersey
Eastern Regional High School ; Voorhees, NJ (4 games)

1999
Carey Stadium; Ocean City, New Jersey
Edgewood Regional High School; Tansboro, New Jersey (3 games)
Carl Lewis Stadium; Willingboro Township, New Jersey (1 game)

2000
Carey Stadium; Ocean City, New Jersey
Edgewood Regional High School; Tansboro, New Jersey (2 games)
Lenape High School; Medford, New Jersey (1 game)

2001
Cherokee High School; Marlton, New Jersey
Carey Stadium; Ocean City, New Jersey (3 games)

2002
Rutgers-Camden Community Park; Camden, New Jersey (5 games)
Carey Stadium; Ocean City, New Jersey (5 games)

2003
Stadium at Mercer County Community College; West Windsor, New Jersey

2004
Winslow Stadium; Winslow, New Jersey (2004)

2005–present
Carey Stadium; Ocean City, New Jersey

All Time MLS Draft Picks

References

External links
 
 Nor'easters All-Time Results
 Ocean City Nor'easters USL2 Team Records
 Ocean City Nor'easters USL2 Individual Records
 Ocean City Nor'easters Year-By-Year Individual Stats
 Ocean City Nor'easters All-Time Goalkeeper Stats
 Ocean City Nor'easters USL2 career stat leaders

Association football clubs established in 1996
USL League Two teams
Soccer clubs in New Jersey
USL Second Division teams
1996 establishments in New Jersey
Ocean City, New Jersey